Mairembam Koireng Singh (1915–1994) also known as Moirang Koireng  was the first elected Chief Minister of Manipur, India.

References
An article " The life and works of Shri Mairembam Koireng Singh" by Moirangthem Rajendra Singh in "Yenning" XV No. Exclusive Edition.
A Souvenir released on 80th birth anniversary of Shri Koireng Singh by "The M Koireng Memorial Trust".

1915 births
1994 deaths
Indian National Army personnel
Chief Ministers of Manipur
Chief ministers from Indian National Congress
Manipur politicians
Indian National Congress politicians
Janata Party politicians
People from Bishnupur district
Manipur MLAs 1967–1972
Manipur MLAs 1972–1974
Manipur MLAs 1974–1979